Stod Idrettslag is a Norwegian sports club from Stod, Nord-Trøndelag. It has sections for volleyball, association football and Nordic skiing.

It was founded in 1902.

The women's volleyball team plays in the highest Norwegian league. Its home arena is Stodhallen. It has a cooperation with Steinkjer Upper Secondary School.

The club currently does not field any senior team in football, only one seven-a-side team for men.

References

Official site

Norwegian volleyball clubs
Football clubs in Norway
Sport in Trøndelag
Steinkjer
Association football clubs established in 1902
1902 establishments in Norway